Albert Rudé Rull (born 18 September 1987) is a Spanish manager, who is currently in charge of CD Castellón.

Coaching career

Born in Ripoll, Girona, Catalonia, Rudé began his career training amateur football clubs in his native region, as well as being a university professor at the University of Vic - Central University of Catalonia. In December 2015, he joined Mexican side CF Pachuca as an assistant manager to Diego Alonso, and would spend the next three years working alongside him.

After leaving Pachuca, Rudé stayed in Mexico and was named manager of the under-17 team of Querétaro FC on 18 July 2018. He left the club after a year, and reunited with Alonso at CF Monterrey, again as his assistant.

On 13 January 2020, Rudé was once again named as Alonso's assistant, this time at Major League Soccer side Inter Miami CF for their inaugural campaign. On 7 January 2021, after Alonso left the club by mutual consent, he also departed the club.

On 30 September 2021, Rudé took his first outright job as a manager, as he was named the head coach of Costa Rican side LD Alajuelense. On 11 July 2022, after nearly ten months in charge, he was sacked following a 1–1 draw against CS Cartaginés four days earlier.

On 19 January 2023, Rudé returned to his home country and took over Primera Federación side CD Castellón, signing a contract until 2024; he replaced Rubén Torrecilla, who was sacked over a month before.

Managerial statistics

References

External links

1987 births
Living people
People from Ripollès
Sportspeople from Catalonia
Spanish football managers
Primera Federación managers
CD Castellón managers
L.D. Alajuelense managers
Spanish expatriate football managers
Spanish expatriate sportspeople in Mexico
Spanish expatriate sportspeople in the United States
Spanish expatriate sportspeople in Costa Rica
Expatriate football managers in Costa Rica